Thomas Jefferson Brown (July 24, 1836 – May 26, 1915) was a justice of the Supreme Court of Texas from May 1893 to May 1915, serving as chief justice from January 1911 to May 1915.

Born in Jasper County, Georgia, at the age of ten Brown moved with his family to Washington County, Texas. He attended the schools of Washington County, and received an LL.B. from Baylor University, in 1856, passing the bar exam the following year. He served in the American Civil War as a second lieutenant, and later captain, in the Twenty-second Texas Cavalry. After the war, he returned to the practice of law, He served in the Texas legislature from 1888 to 1892, in the Twenty-first Texas Legislature and Twenty-second Texas Legislature. While there, Brown "focused his energies on establishing regulations to curb corporate aggression and led an effort that resulted in the creation of the Texas Railroad Commission".

He was a Texas district court judge from 1892 to 1893. In 1893, he became an associate justice of the state supreme court of Texas, until January, 1911, when Chief Justice Gaines resigned and Brown was appointed chief justice.

References

1836 births
1915 deaths
People from Jasper County, Georgia
Baylor University alumni
Members of the Texas Legislature
Justices of the Texas Supreme Court
19th-century American judges